Seth Scamman (also spelled Scammon) (1811–1894) was an American farmer, educator and politician from Maine. Scamman, a Republican, was elected to the Maine House of Representatives in 1855 and re-elected a year later. In 1857, Scamman was elected to the Maine Senate. Re-elected in 1858, Scamman was chosen by his peers to be Senate President.

Scamman was born into one of Saco, Maine's most prominent families. Beyond being involved in politics, Scamman was a farmer and schoolteacher. During the American Civil War, he served as Superintendent of the State Reform School for Boys.

References

1811 births
1894 deaths
People from Saco, Maine
Republican Party members of the Maine House of Representatives
Presidents of the Maine Senate
Republican Party Maine state senators
Farmers from Maine
Educators from Maine
19th-century American politicians
19th-century American educators